The Aare is a tributary of the Rhine and the longest river in Switzerland.

Aare may also refer to:

Aare (given name), Estonian masculine given name
Aare (surname), Estonian surname

See also 
 AAR (disambiguation)
 Åre (disambiguation)